Notodonta scitipennis, the finned-willow prominent or base-streaked prominent, is a species of moth in the family Notodontidae (the prominents). It was first described by Francis Walker in 1862 and it is found in North America.

The MONA or Hodges number for Notodonta scitipennis is 7926.

References

Further reading

 
 
 

Notodontidae
Articles created by Qbugbot
Moths described in 1862